Coccotrypes carpophagus is a species of typical bark beetle in the family Curculionidae.

It is native to Africa but is now widely distributed in Asia, Australia, North America, Central America and South America.

References

Further reading

 
 

Scolytinae
Beetles of Africa
Beetles of Asia
Beetles of Central America
Beetles of North America
Beetles of South America
Articles created by Qbugbot
Beetles described in 1842